Tozhuppedu, or Perumber Kandigai is a town in the Kancheepuram district of Tamil Nadu, India. It has a railway station and a bus stop for buses to Tindivanam.

Cities and towns in Kanchipuram district